Gyula  , is a Hungarian male given name. It was adopted as a given name sometime after the establishment of the Kingdom of Hungary. It was revived in the 19th century and is often associated with the Latin name Julius.

Notable persons
 Gyula Aggházy (1850–1919), Hungarian genre painter and art teacher
 Gyula Andrássy (1823–1890), Hungarian statesman; Prime Minister of Hungary, Foreign Minister of Austria-Hungary
 Gyula Andrássy the Younger (1860–1929), Hungarian politician
 Gyula Babos (1949-2018), Hungarian jazz guitarist
 Gyula Bádonyi (1882–1944), Hungarian footballer
 Gyula Batthyány (1887-1959), Hungarian painter and graphic artist 
 Gyula Benczúr (1844-1920), Hungarian artist
 Gyula Bíró (1890–1961), Hungarian Olympic football player 
 Gyula Bóbis (1909–1972), Hungarian heavyweight wrestler
 Gyula Bodrogi (born 1934), Hungarian television and film actor
 Gyula Cseszneky (1914–1970), Hungarian aristocrat, poet, cavalry officer
 Gyula Csortos (1883–1945), Hungarian film and stage actor
 Gyula Derkovits (1894-1934) Hungarian painter and graphic artist
 Gyula Feldmann (1880—1955), Hungarian football player and coach
 Gyula Gál (born 1976), Hungarian handball player
 Gyula Germanus (1884–1979), Hungarian orientalist, politician, writer and academic
 Gyula Glykais (1893–1948), Hungarian fencer
 Gyula Gózon (1885–1972), Hungarian actor and comedian
 Gyula Gömbös (1886–1936), Hungarian military officer and politician, Prime Minister of Hungary 
 Gyula Grosics (1926–2014), Hungarian footballer
 Gyula Horn (1932–2013), Hungarian politician; third Prime Minister of Hungary
 Gyula Illyés (1902–1983), Hungarian poet and novelist
 Gyula Kabos (1887–1941), Hungarian actor and comedian
 Gyula Kállai (1910–1996), Hungarian Communist politician 
 Gyula Károlyi (1871–1947), Hungarian politician, Prime Minister of Hungary
 Gyula Katona (born 1941) Hungarian mathematician
 Gyula Kellner (1871–1940), Hungarian athlete
 Gyula Kertész (1888–1982), Hungarian footballer
 Gyula Koi (1977–), Hungarian legal scholar and administrative lawyer
 Gyula Kőnig (1849–1913), Hungarian mathematician
 Gyula Kristó (1939–2004), Hungarian historian 
 Gyula Krúdy (1878–1933), Hungarian writer and journalist
 Gyula László (1910–1998), Hungarian historian, archaeologist and artist
 Gyula Lóránt (1923–1981), Hungarian footballer and manager
 Gyula Mándi (1899-1969), Hungarian Olympic footballer and manager
 Gyula Németh (linguist) (1890–1976), Hungarian linguist and turkologist
 Gyula Ortutay (1910–1978), Hungarian ethnographer and politician
 Gyula Pados (born 1969), Hungarian cinematographer and director
 Gyula Pártos (1845–1916), Hungarian architect
 Gyula Sáringer (1928–2009), Hungarian agronomist and entomologist
 Gyula Szabó (1930–2014), Hungarian actor
 Gyula Szapáry (1832–1905), Hungarian politician, Prime Minister of Hungary
 Gyula Török (1938–2014), Hungarian boxer
 Gyula Vikidál (born 1948), Hungarian singer
 Gyula Wlassics (1852–1937), Hungarian politician
 Gyula Zsivótzky (1937–2007), Hungarian hammer thrower
 Gyula Grosz (1962), Hungarian Artist and Jewelry Designer

See also
Gyula (title), a Hungarian title of the 9th-10th century It means Leader.
Gyula II, the gyula who was baptized in Constantinople around 950
Gyula III, the gyula who was defeated by King Stephen I of Hungary around 1003

Given names
Hungarian masculine given names